Richard Allen Huisman (born May 17, 1969) is an American former Major League Baseball (MLB) pitcher who played for the Kansas City Royals in 1995 and 1996.

Amateur career
Huisman attended Timothy Christian High School in Elmhurst, Illinois and graduated in 1987. He also played baseball at Lewis University. In 1989, he played collegiate summer baseball with the Chatham A's of the Cape Cod Baseball League and was named a league all-star.

Professional career
Huisman was drafted by the San Francisco Giants in the third round of the 1990 MLB Draft and signed a contract on June 11 of that year. In 1993, he was selected off waivers by the Houston Astros. Two years later, he was traded to the Kansas City Royals for Pat Borders.

Huisman pitched in a total of 29 games in the Major Leagues over two seasons with the Royals; his record was two wins and one loss. Huisman's earned run average was 4.89. On August 12, 1996, Huisman pitched 3 innings to close out a 10-4 Royals victory over the Mariners. Preserving the win for Kevin Appier, it was Husiman's only major league save. His final game was played on September 28, 1996.

Personal
In May 2012, Huisman became the Executive Director of The Boys & Girls Clubs of Grand Rapids Youth Commonwealth.

References

External links
, or Retrosheet, or Venezuelan Winter League

1969 births
Living people
American expatriate baseball players in Mexico
Baseball players from Illinois
Chatham Anglers players
Clinton Giants players
Everett Giants players
Fresno Grizzlies players
Jackson Generals (Texas League) players
Kansas City Royals players
Lewis Flyers baseball players
Major League Baseball pitchers
Memphis Redbirds players
Mexican League baseball pitchers
Navegantes del Magallanes players
American expatriate baseball players in Venezuela
New Orleans Zephyrs players
Omaha Royals players
People from Oak Lawn, Illinois
Phoenix Firebirds players
Rochester Red Wings players
San Jose Giants players
Shreveport Captains players
Sportspeople from Oak Park, Illinois
Sultanes de Monterrey players
Tucson Toros players